KGMM-CD (channel 24) is a low-power television station in San Antonio, Texas, United States, affiliated with Grit. The station is owned by CNZ Communications. The station's transmitter is located near Elmendorf, in southeastern Bexar County.

Technical information

Subchannels
The station's digital signal is multiplexed:

FCC Spectrum incentive auction 
The station moved from channel 24 to channel 36 effective July 3, 2019 as part of the FCC's channel repack. Along with the new frequency, the station is expected to relocate the transmitter facility to a tower located near Gardendale.

References

External links

GMM-CD
Television channels and stations established in 1999
1999 establishments in Texas
Low-power television stations in the United States
Grit (TV network) affiliates
TheGrio affiliates